Granit Mikashevichi is a football club from Mikashevichi, Belarus.

History 
The team started playing in the Belarusian Second League in 1994. In 1999, they made their debut in the First League, and in 2008 finally in the Premier League. After the relegation in 2009, they will again play in the First League.

Name changes 
1978: FC Granit Mikashevichi is founded
2006: renamed to FC Mikashevichi
2007: renamed back to FC Granit Mikashevichi

Current squad 
As of August 2022

League and Cup history

References

External links 
Official Website
Granit at EUFO.DE
Granit at Weltfussball.de
Granit at Football-Lineups.com

Football clubs in Belarus
Brest Region
1978 establishments in Belarus
Association football clubs established in 1978